The imbricate alligator lizard (Barisia jonesi) is a species of medium-sized lizard in the family Anguidae. The species is endemic to Mexico.

References

Barisia
Reptiles of Mexico
Reptiles described in 1982
Taxa named by Hobart Muir Smith